is a 2011 song written by Japanese former vocaloid music producer  released with the voice of Hatsune Miku.

Release and reception 
"Senbonzakura" was first posted onto Niconico on 17 September 2011 by Kurousa-P. Accompanied by a fast rock-inspired beat, the lyrics reference the westernization of Japan and the transitional imperialistic Taishō era.

After its release on Niconico, the music video became viral and broke one million views in 42 days (by 29 October). The song is also very popular among karaoke singers. Joysound, a karaoke store chain, reported that "Senbonzakura" was the third most-sung song in 2012, behind AKB48's "Heavy Rotation" and Golden Bomber's "Memeshikute". The song was performed by Sachiko Kobayashi on the 66th NHK Kōhaku Uta Gassen. Hatsune Miku also regularly performs "Senbonzakura" during her concerts.

Wagakki Band version 

Wagakki Band covered "Senbonzakura" and released their music video on YouTube on 31 January 2014. The video was shot at Nakoso no Seki in Iwaki, Fukushima. The cover introduced the world to the band's style of mixing traditional Japanese musical instruments (wagakki) with heavy metal, and it has been their most well-known song in their discography. In 2019, the video broke 100 million views.

Other derivative works 
To celebrate the video's first anniversary, on 12 September 2012, an album titled All That Senbonzakura! was released by Dwango. The album only contained "Senbonzakura" covered by different instruments, including piano, yangqin, acoustic guitar, and string quartet. Other solo artists have also released their own covers of the song.

The music video's illustrator, Ittomaru, went on to release several works adapted from the song. On 9 March 2013, Ittomaru released a light novel series based on the song published by ASCII Media Works. The novel is set in a dystopian world where the Taishō era continued for a hundred years and features Hatsune Miku as the main protagonist. The first volume topped Oricon's weekly novel sales chart and was also the thirteenth bestselling book for the month. The same month, Niconico hosted a musical based on the novel's storyline and featured AKB48 members Haruka Ishida, Maho Tomita, and Miori Ichikawa as well as actor Kazuki Kato.

Charts

References

External links 
 "Senbonzakura" on Niconico

2011 songs
2012 singles
Vocaloid songs
Wagakki Band
Songs about cherry blossom